Erkin Maksudovich Shagayev (born February 12, 1959), was an Uzbekistani water polo player  who was the part of the Soviet water polo team which won the gold medal in the 1980 Summer Olympics in Moscow. He was born in Tashkent and played for the Mekhnat club there.

See also
 Soviet Union men's Olympic water polo team records and statistics
 List of Olympic champions in men's water polo
 List of Olympic medalists in water polo (men)
 List of world champions in men's water polo
 List of World Aquatics Championships medalists in water polo

References

External links
 

Olympic water polo players of the Soviet Union
Water polo players at the 1980 Summer Olympics
Olympic gold medalists for the Soviet Union
Olympic medalists in water polo
Living people
1959 births
Sportspeople from Tashkent
Medalists at the 1980 Summer Olympics
Soviet male water polo players
Uzbekistani male water polo players
Australia men's national water polo team coaches
Water polo coaches at the 2004 Summer Olympics
Honoured Masters of Sport of the USSR